Woman in Hiding is a 1950 American film noir crime film directed by Michael Gordon and starring Ida Lupino, Stephen McNally and Howard Duff.

Plot
Deborah Chandler Clark watches police drag a North Carolina river for her body. She recounts the events that brought her to this, beginning when her father, a mill owner, disapproved of a romance between Deborah and the mill's general manager, Selden Clark.

Her father falls to his death at the mill. Selden consoles her and proposes. On their honeymoon, a jealous and angry woman named Patricia Monahan turns up and claims she's been romantically-involved with Selden, insisting he married Deborah simply to gain control of her mill.

Deborah demands an annulment of the marriage. While leaving, the brakes fail on her car. She leaps out just before it crashes into the river. Believing she would be unable to prove her husband's guilt, Deborah disappears, moving to Knoxville and going by the name Ann Carter.

An ex-soldier, Keith Ramsey, seems interested in Ann and follows her. What he's really interested in is a $5,000 reward offered by her husband. At a hotel hosting a crowded convention, Selden nearly succeeds in killing his wife. Keith finally realizes that Deborah is in genuine danger.

Patricia can confirm her story, so Deborah tracks her down. Patricia betrays her, however, still being in love with Selden. At the mill, he attempts to throw Deborah to her death the same way he murdered her father. In the darkness, he mistakenly kills Patricia instead. Selden and Keith enter a life-or-death struggle by a ledge, which is interrupted when Selden is so shocked to see Deborah still alive that he falls to his death. Deborah and Keith later get married.

Cast
 Ida Lupino as Deborah Chandler Clark
 Stephen McNally as Selden Clark
 Howard Duff as Keith Ramsey
 Peggy Dow as Patricia Monahan
 John Litel as John Chandler
 Taylor Holmes as Lucius Maury
 Irving Bacon as Link
 Don Beddoe as Fat Salesman
 Joe Besser as Salesman with Drum

Reception
When released, critic Bosley Crowther gave the film a mostly positive review.  He wrote, "Although it never pretends to be anything but melodrama, Woman in Hiding, unlike so many offerings in this genre, adds some convincing characterizations to its suspense. The combination of the two attributes succeeds in raising this new arrival at the Criterion a notch or two above the normal in this category emanating from the Coast. And, aside from a climax which is something less than inspired, Michael Gordon's direction of this story of a newlywed's desperate flight from her homicidal husband is paced toward mounting tension despite some implausible aspects here and there."

Film critic Dennis Schwartz called the film a "Patchy melodrama." He wrote, "Patchy melodrama with too many contrived suspense escape scenes and too pat an ending to be anything better than a modest thriller, but Ida Lupino as the damsel-in-distress is terrific. Michael Gordon (Pillow Talk/Boys' Night Out/Cyrano de Bergerac) directs in a workmanlike and capable way."

References

External links
 
 
 
 

1950 films
1950s thriller films
American thriller films
American black-and-white films
Film noir
Films directed by Michael Gordon
Universal Pictures films
1950s English-language films
1950s American films